This is a complete list of New York State Historic Markers in Richmond County, New York.

Listings county-wide

See also
List of New York State Historic Markers
National Register of Historic Places listings in Richmond County, New York
List of National Historic Landmarks in New York

References

Richmond
History of Staten Island
Staten Island-related lists